John Farquharson Smith, Baron Kirkhill (born 7 May 1930) is a life peer and retired member of the House of Lords of the United Kingdom where he held the Labour Party whip. He was Lord Provost of Aberdeen from 1971 to 1975 and served as Minister of State for Scotland from 8 August 1975 to 15 December 1978. Smith was created a Life Peer as Baron Kirkhill, of Kirkhill in the District of the City of Aberdeen on 17 July 1975.

Kirkhill was Chairman of the North of Scotland Hydro-Electric Board from 1979 to 1982. He retired from the House of Lords on 30 April 2018.

Sources
Who's Who in Scotland, 2008
 http://hansard.millbanksystems.com/people/mr-john-smith-7
 http://biographies.parliament.uk/parliament/default.asp?id=26852

References

1930 births
Living people
Labour Party (UK) life peers
Lord Provosts of Aberdeen
Life peers created by Elizabeth II